Bruce Sinclair may refer to:

 Bruce Sinclair (rugby league) (born 1965), Australian rugby league player
 Bruce Sinclair (historian), University of Toronto IHPST
 Bruce Sinclair (politician), Etobicoke councillor and mayor, 1984–1993; Toronto City Councillor, 1998–2000